Azucena Díaz (born 19 December 1982) is a Spanish long distance runner who specialises in the marathon. She competed in the women's marathon event at the 2016 Summer Olympics.

Achievements

References

External links
 

1982 births
Living people
Spanish female long-distance runners
Spanish female marathon runners
Athletes (track and field) at the 2016 Summer Olympics
Olympic athletes of Spain
Athletes from Madrid
20th-century Spanish women
21st-century Spanish women